Tulpehocken station is a SEPTA Regional Rail station in Philadelphia, Pennsylvania. Located at 333 West Tulpehocken Street in the Germantown neighborhood, it serves the Chestnut Hill West Line. The Pennsylvania Railroad built the station in 1878. The station is in zone 2 on the Chestnut Hill West Line, and is 8.5 track miles from Suburban Station. In 2004, this station saw 176 boardings on an average weekday.

History

Although commonly attributed to architect Frank Furness, the actual architects for all of the stations on the Chestnut Hill West line (part of the Pennsylvania Railroad at the time) were William Brown and William Bleddyn Powell, who were under contract to PRR. This information comes from the Philadelphia Historical Commission in its nominations for the registry of Historic Places. (Furness designed station buildings on the Reading Railroad.) All of the Chestnut Hill West stations are now on the Philadelphia Register of Historic Places. The Tulpehocken Station is a contributing property in the Tulpehocken Station Historic District of the National Register of Historic Places.

The station building had either a ticket office or a business in it and a residence above it until 1978. The building was closed although the station stop continued. SEPTA provided little or no maintenance to the building and it deteriorated significantly.

In November 2007, the West Central Germantown Neighbors (WCGN) formed a committee, Save Tulpehocken Station, in an attempt to recover the station and return it to a viable use. Working with SEPTA, Philadelphia City Planning, and local politicians, the local residents raised funds to match a grant from the National Trust for Historic Preservation. The grant funded a project manager to assess the structural condition of the building and to identify a viable business use for it.

In the spring of 2009, SEPTA received federal economic stimulus funds which were allotted to the Chestnut Hill West line for building repairs. As a result, the Tulpehocken station building received repairs aimed to encourage a business developer to make use of the space.

The reconstruction of the station building included complete removal of all rotten and unusable wood and the replacement and restoration of the timbers which supported the canopy, as well as ceramic tile trim over the windows. The extending "porch" was preserved and cantilevered so that it can be used for occupancy. When completed, the exterior was in the same condition as the original building. The interior has two open floors with plywood flooring. The remnants of a chimney are in the middle of the structure. SEPTA uses the space for some storage and to house the communication system. Salvaged windows and doors are in the basement. The second floor has exhaust fans to prevent mold and overheating in the summer.

The building is still unoccupied in 2018. However, in May and June, 2018 SEPTA provided new supply water, gas and sewer service (pumped up hill to Wayne Avenue) to the space so that it can be leased to a developer. Several attempts have been made to acquire funding for windows. To date those efforts have been unsuccessful.

Orchard and garden

Following completion of the building 2011 WCGN approached SEPTA with a proposal to recover an overgrown and littered portion of SEPTA property next to the station building. WCGN proposed an Orchard/Garden to be developed in conjunction with the Philadelphia Orchard Project. The plan was approved and WCGN spent a year designing the layout to include fruit trees, native trees, berries and shrubs which would allow the public to stroll around the space and harvest the produce. SEPTA provided the machinery and labor to remove dead trees and large, dumped items. WCGN filled dumpsters supplied by SEPTA. Once the lot was cleared, WCGN tilled it and planted grass. By 2014, trees acquired from the Philadelphia Orchard Project were planted. Several work days also planted bushes and berries.

The orchard has peaches, pears, plums and apples, including an unusual Tulpehocken apple variety. Blackberries, service berries, raspberries and blue berries are providing fruit. A pollinator garden was planted in 2017. SEPTA mows the grass around the trees and planting patches. WCGN maintains the plants, mulches and prunes the fruit trees.

Station layout

Gallery

References

External links

SEPTA - Tulpehocken Station

SEPTA Regional Rail stations
Former Pennsylvania Railroad stations
Philadelphia Register of Historic Places
Railway stations on the National Register of Historic Places in Pennsylvania
Railway stations in the United States opened in 1878
Railway stations in Philadelphia
Historic district contributing properties in Pennsylvania
Germantown, Philadelphia
National Register of Historic Places in Philadelphia